Obscenity is a German death metal band from Oldenburg that formed in 1989. The band has released ten studio albums, their most recent being Summoning the Circle, which was released in 2018.

Members

Current members 
 Sascha Knust- drums (1989–2000, 2011–present)
 Hendrick Bruns- guitar (1989–present)
 Christoph Weerts- guitar (2011–present)
 David Speckmann- bass (2016–present)
 Manuel Siewert- vocals (2016–present)

Past members 
 Dirk Vogt- guitar (1989–1993)
 Oliver Jauch- vocals (1989–2009)
 Thimo Gerhardt- bass (1993–1997)
 Jens Finger- guitar (1994–2010)
 Jens Claussen- bass (1997–1998)
 Alexander Pahl- bass (1999–2006)
 Marc-Andree Dieken- drums (2000–2009)
 Gregor Frischko- bass (2007–2011)
 Jeff Rudes- vocals (2010–2013)
 Jorg Pirch- bass (2011–?)
 Tobias Mueller- vocals (2013–?)

Discography 

 Suffocated Truth (1992, West Virginia)
 Perversion Mankind (1994, D&S)
 The 3rd Chapter (1996, Morbid)
 Human Barbecue (1998, Morbid)
 Intense (2000, Morbid)
 Cold Blooded Murder (2002, Morbid)
 Where Sinners Bleed (2006, Armageddon)
 Atrophied in Anguish (2012, Apostasy)
 Retaliation (2016, Kolony)
 Summoning the Circle (2018, Apostasy)

References

External links 
 

Death metal musical groups
German death metal musical groups